Dorcadion subsericatum is a species of beetle in the family Cerambycidae. It was described by Pic in 1901. It is known from Turkey.

Subspecies
 Dorcadion subsericatum major Breuning, 1962
 Dorcadion subsericatum rufipenne Breuning, 1946
 Dorcadion subsericatum subsericatum Pic, 1901
 Dorcadion subsericatum vulneratum Pesarini & Sabbadini, 1998

References

subsericatum
Beetles described in 1901